Ann Pratt (born 1830) was a mixed-race "mulatto" woman from Hanover Parish, Jamaica, recognised for her pan-Empire influencing pamphlet 'Seven Months in the Kingston Lunatic Asylum and what I saw there', August 21, 1860. The pamphlet told of her first-hand accounts and observations of torture and perpetual mistreatment towards the patients of Kingston Lunatic Asylum, during her own time there as a patient.

Following the publication of her account, there took place immediate staff reforms within Kingston's Lunatic Asylums; including dismissals of the alleged key perpetrators of the abuse and instigating a local enquiry in 1861 into colonial asylum governance across Kingston. Subsequently, the pamphlet has been identified as crucial in creating greater awareness of  said poor practices across the British colonies at the time and leading to a subsequent investigation across the Empire's entire colonial asylum system.

In the preface of the pamphlet, Ann states "My object in coming before the public with the following facts [is] to make known to all, whom it concerns, the actual treatment of the unfortunate people that came within the walls of Kingston Lunatic Asylum."

Early life 
Within the contents of Ann's influential pamphlet, she details briefly about her early life leading up to her admittance to Kingston Lunatic Asylum.

Ann was born in 1830 Hanover Parish to a mixed parentage. She details having two children prior to her admittance. She details of being raped in 1859, for which she was trialed, and during the process she experienced a mental breakdown. Having originally been sent to female prison, she was then transferred to Kingston Asylum after being declared psychologically unfit.

References 

1830 births
Date of death missing
People from Hanover Parish